Hamline Avenue station is a light rail station on the Metro Green Line in Saint Paul, Minnesota. It is located along University Avenue on both sides of the intersection with Hamline Avenue. The station has split side platforms, with the westbound platform on the north side of the tracks west of Hamline and the eastbound platform on the south side of the tracks east of the intersection.

Along with Victoria Street Station and Western Avenue Station, this station was originally planned to be an infill station that would be built after the main line had been constructed when there was sufficient demand.  However, significant political pressure and changes in the Federal Transit Administration's rules led to an early 2010 announcement that it would be built with the rest of the line.

Construction in this area began in 2011.  The station opened along with the rest of the line in 2014.

References

External links
Metro Transit: Hamline Avenue Station

Metro Green Line (Minnesota) stations in Saint Paul, Minnesota
Railway stations in the United States opened in 2014
2014 establishments in Minnesota